The 1971 Rice Owls football team was an American football team that represented Rice University in the Southwest Conference (SWC) during the 1971 NCAA University Division football season. In its first and only season under head coach Bill Peterson, the team compiled a 3–7–1 record (2–4–1 against SWC opponents), finished sixth in the conference, and was outscored by a total of 220 to 146. The team played its home games at Rice Stadium in Houston.

The team's statistical leaders included Bruce Gadd with 1,061 passing yards, Stahle Vincent with 945 rushing yards, Gary Butler with 397 receiving yards, and Bubba Berg and Stahle Vincent with 18 points each. Stahle Vincent was selected by the Associated Press as a first-team running back on the 1971 All-Southwest Conference football team.

Schedule

References

Rice
Rice Owls football seasons
Rice Owls football